Michael Murach (1 February 1911 – 16 August 1941) was a German amateur welterweight boxer. He won a silver medal at the 1936 Olympics, losing in the final to Sten Suvio. Murach won a European title in 1937 and five national titles in 1935 and 1937–1940. He was killed in action during World War II.

1936 Olympic results
Below is the record of Michael Murach, a German welterweight boxer who competed at the 1936 Berlin Olympics:

 Round of 32: bye
 Round of 16: defeated Walter Pack (Great Britain) on points
 Quarterfinal: defeated Hens Dekkers (Netherlands) on points
 Semifinal: defeated Roger Tritz (France) on points
 Final: lost to Sten Suvio (Finland) on points (was awarded silver medal)

References

1911 births
1941 deaths
Sportspeople from Gelsenkirchen
Welterweight boxers
Olympic boxers of Germany
Boxers at the 1936 Summer Olympics
Olympic silver medalists for Germany
Olympic medalists in boxing
German Army personnel killed in World War II
German male boxers
Medalists at the 1936 Summer Olympics
Military personnel from Gelsenkirchen